Westermann Verlag (English: "Westermann Publishing") is a German publishing firm, founded in the 19th century in Braunschweig, Duchy of Brunswick by George Westermann (23 February 1810 in Leipzig;  7 September 1879 in Wiesbaden). Several other generations of the Westermann family succeeded him. In 1986, the "Westermann Druck- und Verlagsgruppe" in Braunschweig, comprising numerous branches, became part of Medien-Union based in Ludwigshafen, employing 800.

Westermann is renowned for its meticulous world history-atlas in German, the Großer Atlas zur Weltgeschichte, generally known as "the Westermann."

For use in schools, they continue to publish the Carl Diercke Schul-Atlas, a series started in the 19th century, since called Diercke Weltatlas. They also offer products related to or using Google Earth, 3D-technology, and globes.

Divisions 
 Westermann Schulbuchverlag (Braunschweig)
 Georg Westermann Verlag (Braunschweig)
 Westermann Lernspielverlag GmbH (Braunschweig)
 Westermann Wien im Verlag E. Dorner GmbH (Vienna, Austria)
 Pauz-Westermann Könyvkiadó Kft. (Celldömölk, Hungary)
 Westermann Druck GmbH (Braunschweig)
 Westermann Druck Zwickau GmbH (Zwickau)
 Arena Verlag GmbH (Würzburg)
 Schroedel Verlag (Braunschweig)
 Verlag Moritz Diesterweg (Braunschweig)
 Verlag Ferdinand Schöningh (Braunschweig)
 Verlag Jugend & Volk
 Winklers Verlag (Darmstadt)
 VSB-Verlagsservice Braunschweig GmbH (Braunschweig)

Further reading

See also
 Books in Germany

References

External links

 
 
 

Book publishing companies of Germany
Atlases
Companies based in Braunschweig
Mass media in Braunschweig
19th-century establishments in the Duchy of Brunswick
1838 establishments in Saxony
Publishing companies established in 1838
German companies established in 1838